The Sigma Society is a secret society at Washington and Lee University in Lexington, Virginia. Founded in 1880, it is one of the older secret societies in the United States, and remains "one of the oldest continuous social organizations at Washington and Lee." The Sigma Society is roughly 70 years older than the Cadaver Society, and together these two organizations comprise the main two "secret" societies at Washington and Lee. In contrast with the strictly secretive membership of the Cadaver Society, the Sigma Society is not anonymous.

History
The Sigma Society was founded at Washington and Lee in 1880 and remains in existence today. Though qualifications for membership are not published, members consistently comprise the top student leaders on the W&L campus. The group also has ties to President George Washington, who is one of the founding benefactors of Washington and Lee University. Though the connection is not known to the public, University newspapers have consistently tracked the relationship. For instance, annual initiation proceedings take place on Washington's birthday—February, 22—and many of the initiation rites involve tributes to Washington himself. The organization is often referred to as the "Washington Society." It is not known whether the connection to Washington has any significance to the "P.A.M.O.L.A. R.Y.E." emblem that is often found inscribed on chairs, desks, and in bathroom stalls throughout the University campus and greater Lexington area.

Despite the public knowledge of the identity of many Sigma Members, the inner workings of the group remain unknown. In the early 1900s, the group held well-attended balls annually, including the German Ball and Easter Ball. However, a rocky relationship with the administration forced the group to remove itself from active University participation.  Two plaques on the University campus commemorate the group. There is a plaque in Lee Chapel honoring the lives of two Sigma alumni from the classes of 1912 and 1915 who lost their lives in World War I, and another in the Science Library commemorating the former location of the Sigma Cabin, that reads: "Near this site stood the cabin which, for more than sixty years, was the meeting place for members of the Sigma Society…Founded in 1880, the Sigma Society is one of the oldest, continuous social organizations at W&L." The University paid the Sigma Society $15,000 when it tore down the Sigma Cabin in 1994. The University needed the land to build the current Science Library. It is not known whether the Sigma Society has used those funds to establish a new group location. As noted by Chief Justice William Rehnquist, Supreme Court Justice Lewis Powell, Jr. is one of the group's most prominent members.

Prominent members

Harry "Cy" Young, Washington and Lee Class of 1917
Justice Lewis Powell, Jr., Associate Justice of the Supreme Court of the United States, Washington and Lee Class of 1929

See also
Collegiate secret societies in North America
Secret society
Lee Chapel

References

External links 
 Washington and Lee Journalism November 17, 2005

Collegiate secret societies
Student societies in the United States
Washington and Lee University
Student organizations established in 1880